Chokito is a combination chocolate bar brand, created and owned by Nestlé. The original bar consists of an ingot-shaped caramel fudge center, with a coating of milk chocolate and crisped rice on the outside. It is manufactured by Nestlé in Switzerland, Brazil, and Australia.

The Chokito bar is originally made in Switzerland at the Nestlé-owned Cailler factory in Broc since 1964, as a modernized version of the long-established Branche chocolate bar, to counter competition from other brands. Shortly after, in 1965, a modified version was launched in the United Kingdom. The bar became very popular on the Swiss market and soon faced competition from Frey, who introduced the equivalent Risoletto in 1967. The chocolate bar was then launched in Brazil and Australia in the 1970s. In 2018, Swiss production was relocated elsewhere in Switzerland.

Advertising
Chokito was relaunched in 2010 in Australia with new packaging and a new recipe reformulation. This included moving away from compound chocolate that was in the original formula.  Also in 2010 was a new advertising campaign based around a man barring club bouncers from entering places like bathrooms and a gym, saying the advertising's catchphrase, "No no no."  The campaign, targeted at men 24–35, had 380,000 views in two weeks, on sites YouTube and Break.com. The new formulation Chokito was launched in New Zealand in 2012. Chokito was also originally marketed by Nestle South Africa in the late 1960s but then withdrawn in the early 1980s.

The current slogan for Chokito in Australia is "big feed, big taste", while in the 1970s the tag line was "Chokito gets you going".

See also
 100 Grand Bar, a similar chocolate bar also introduced by Nestlé in 1964
 List of Nestlé brands

References

External links
 
 Chokito review on the Chocablog

Australian confectionery
2010 establishments in Australia
Chocolate bars
Nestlé brands
Swiss confectionery